Phialiphora is a genus of flowering plants in the family Rubiaceae, native to Madagascar.

Species
, Plants of the World Online accepted the following species:
Phialiphora bevazahensis Groeninckx
Phialiphora capitulata Groeninckx
Phialiphora glabrata De Block
Phialiphora valida De Block

References 

Rubiaceae genera
Spermacoceae